Marcus Höfl is a German sports manager and investor. Having founded Marcus Höfl Management – MHM Majors, as sports management agency, he has represented the former football player and executive Franz Beckenbauer since 2003.

Life and career 
Höfl is the son of former German speed skater and trainer Herbert Höfl. After his education as a communications manager at the Bayerische Akademie für Werbung und Marketing (Bavarian academy for advertisement and marketing), Höfl set up Marcus Höfl Management – MHM Majors, a sports management and marketing company, in 1997 in Kitzbühel and began managing the former football player and executive Franz Beckenbauer in 2003. In 2011, he married Olympic and world champion Maria Höfl-Riesch.

From 2006 to 2009 Höfl was also responsible for the global development of Red Bull's football activities. He also was member of the supervisory board of DFL Sports Enterprises, the marketing subsidiary of the German football league DFL and member of the Board of Governors of Major League Soccer (MLS). From 2016 to 2021, Höfl was a shareholder and member of the supervisory board of German football club FC Augsburg.

Furthermore, Höfl and his company organize winter sports events such as the Mountain Peak and Winter Sports Summit in Kitzbühel and developed, together with Ghorfa (Arab-German Chamber of Commerce) the event Arab-German Sports Summit. In 2013, he founded Camp Beckenbauer, a global sports platform and sports summit in Kitzbühel.

References 

Year of birth missing (living people)
Living people
German sports agents
FC Augsburg non-playing staff
Association football agents
Major League Soccer executives
German investors